These are the official results of the Women's Hammer Throw event at the 1999 IAAF World Championships in Athletics in Seville, Spain. There were a total number of 21 participating athletes, with the final held on Tuesday 24 August 1999 at 18:00h.

Medalists

Schedule
All times are Central European Time (UTC+1)

Startlist

Records

Final

See also
Athletics at the 1999 Pan American Games - Women's hammer throw
1999 Hammer Throw Year Ranking

References
 IAAF
 todor66
 hammerthrow.wz
 trackandfieldnews

H
Hammer throw at the World Athletics Championships
1999 in women's athletics